Forrester is an unincorporated community in Le Flore County, Oklahoma, United States. A post office was established at Forrester on June 8, 1915; it closed on February 14, 1922.

References

Unincorporated communities in Oklahoma
LeFlore County, Oklahoma